Pteris melanocaulon is a fern species in the subfamily Pteridoideae of the family Pteridaceae. It has been described as edible and no subspecies have been found. It has been found to be a metallophyte and probably has copper as an essential macro-nutrient.

References

melanocaulon
Taxa named by Antoine Laurent Apollinaire Fée